Santosh Pokharel  known widely as Saigrace Pokharel (born 07 Nov 1987). is a Nepalese storyteller, film maker and video producer.

Early life and education 
Pokharel was born and raised in Kathmandu. He started his primary education in Kathmandu. He completed his Post Graduation on Strategy Management from Demort Fort University, Denmark.

Career 
Pokharel formally performed as a storyteller for the first time in 2012 on one of the event organized by sri satya sai sewa sangathan Nepal. In  November2021, Pokharel did an event called Word Tour with Saigrace in seven cities of Nepal: Dhangadhi, Jhapa, Dharan, Chitwan, Butwal, Pokhara and Kathmandu. In December 2021, Pokharel partnered with Jasmine Paints. In 2022, Pokharel performed in Barcelona, Spain. In 2022, Pokharel announced a world tour covering England, Australia and United States. As of September 2022 Pokharel performed in Brisbane, Perth and Sydney on 1, 7 and 19 August respectively.

Discography 
 Adhuro Prem - 2020 
 Naulo Suruwat -2020
 Australia ki nurse -2020
 Nasuljhiyeko Rahasya - 2020
 Khaadiko kathaa - 2020
 Saarika -2021
 Aakriti - 2021

References 

21st-century Nepalese artists
1987 births
Living people